Carolina Cruz-Neira is a Spanish-Venezuelan-American computer engineer, researcher, designer, educator, and a pioneer of virtual reality (VR). She is known for inventing the cave automatic virtual environment (CAVE). She previously worked at Iowa State University (ISU), University of Louisiana at Lafayette (UL Lafayette), University of Arkansas at Little Rock (UA Little Rock), and she is currently an Agere Chair Professor at  University of Central Florida (UCF).

Education
Cruz-Neira graduated cum laude with a degree in systems engineering from the Universidad Metropolitana in Caracas, Venezuela in 1987. She earned a master's degree in electrical engineering and computer science from the University of Illinois, Chicago in 1991, and her PhD in 1995, working under computer graphics researcher Thomas DeFanti.

Work

Cave automatic virtual environment 

The first CAVE was invented by Carolina Cruz-Neira, Daniel J. Sandin, and Thomas A. DeFanti in 1992. For her PhD dissertation, Cruz-Neira designed and developed the CAVE Automatic Virtual Environment, its specifications, and implementation. She also designed and implemented the CAVELib software API, now a commercial product. She was the architect of the Open Source API VR Juggler, an open source virtual reality applications development framework.

The CAVE is an immersive system that became the standard for rear projection-based virtual reality systems. The normal full system consists of projections screens along the front, side and floor axes, and a tracking system for the "user". Although they used the recursive acronym Cave Automatic Virtual Environment for the CAVE system, the name also refers to Plato's "Republic" and "The Allegory of the Cave" where he explored the concepts of reality and human perception.

There have been a couple offshoots of the CAVE technology, including ImmersaDesk, Infinity Wall and Oblong Industries' G-speak system. The ImmersaDesk is a semi-immersive system, resembling a drafting table, while the Infinity Wall is designed to cater to an entire room of people, such as a conference room. Extending this concept, G-speak supports gestural input from multiple-users and multiple-devices on an expandable array of monitors.

Academia 

Cruz-Neira was the Stanley Chair professor in Interdisciplinary Engineering, and a co-founder of the Virtual Reality Applications Center (VRAC) at Iowa State University (ISU). In 2002, Dr. Cruz-Neira co-founded and co-directed the Human-Computer Interaction (HCI) graduate program at ISU.

She later joined the University of Louisiana at Lafayette in 2005, and in 2006, was the first CEO and Chief Scientist of LITE (Louisiana Immersive Technologies Enterprise), a Louisiana State initiative to support economic development in immersive technologies. From 2009 to 2014 she was the W. Hansen Hall and Mary Officer Hall/BORSF Endowed Super Chair in Telecommunications in Computer Engineering at the University of Louisiana at Lafayette.

In 2014, she was named an Arkansas Research Scholar by the Arkansas Research Alliance and moved to Little Rock to lead the Emerging Analytics Center (EAC) at the University of Arkansas at Little Rock.

In 2019, Cruz-Neira joined the University of Central Florida, as an Agere Chair Professor in the Computer Science Department.

Many of her former students are now doing leading work in VR at places such as Unity Labs, Intel, Microsoft Research, Google, DreamWorks, EA, Deere & Company, Boeing, Sony Pictures Imageworks, and Argonne National Laboratory.

Other work 
In 2017, Cruz-Neira was included in episode 8 "the player", in a ten part, Dutch documentary series, The Mind of the Universe (2017) by Robbert Dijkgraaf and VPRO broadcast.

In January, she was invited by Dell to participate in the “VR for Good” panel at the 2018 Consumer Electronics Show to demonstrate how innovators are using virtual reality to make a positive impact on society.

Since June 2019, she has served as Chief Editor of VR and Industry for Frontier's in Virtual Reality Journal.

Awards 

 2007 – awarded the IEEE VGTC Virtual Reality Technical Achievement Award, in recognition of the development of the CAVE.
 2009 – International Digital Media and Arts Association (iDMMa) awarded her the Distinguished Career Award
 2014 – Arkansas Research Alliance Scholar
 2016 – Polygon website's Top 25 VR Innovators award  
 2016 – University Herald websites named her one of the three greatest female innovators in virtual reality
 2018 – In February 2018 Dr. Cruz-Neira was elected to the National Academy of Engineering.
 2018 – Association for Computer Machinery (ACM), named Computer Pioneer.

References

External links 

 Video: The Mind of The Universe (2017), episode 8 on YouTube

Living people
American computer scientists
Virtual reality pioneers
American women computer scientists
Universidad Metropolitana alumni
University of Illinois Chicago alumni
University of Louisiana at Lafayette faculty
Year of birth missing (living people)
University of Arkansas at Little Rock faculty
University of Central Florida faculty
Engineers from Arkansas
Iowa State University faculty
American women academics
21st-century American women